Walter Zembriski (born May 24, 1935) is an American professional golfer who played on the PGA Tour and the Senior PGA Tour.

Zembriski was born in Mahwah, New Jersey. He taught himself how to play golf while working as a caddie at the Out of Bounds Golf Club in Mahwah. His father, Stanley, also worked as a caddie at the same club, and caddied regularly for Babe Ruth.

Zembriski had a brief stint as a member of the PGA Tour in his early thirties after earning his player's card in 1967. During his middle and late thirties, he worked as an ironworker on highrise buildings along the Jersey Shore. During his forties, Zembriski played on the Florida mini-tour. He qualified twice for the U.S. Open during this period, in 1978 and 1982.

Zembriski's greatest success in professional golf came on the Senior PGA Tour, where he won three times.

Zembriski now lives in Orlando, Florida and still plays golf regularly.

Amateur wins (2)
this list is probably incomplete
1964 Ike Tournament
1965 New Jersey Amateur

Professional wins (3)

Senior PGA Tour wins (3)

*Note: The 1988 Newport Cup was shortened to 36 holes due to rain.

Senior PGA Tour playoff record (0–2)

See also
1966 PGA Tour Qualifying School graduates

References

External links

American male golfers
PGA Tour golfers
PGA Tour Champions golfers
Golfers from New Jersey
People from Mahwah, New Jersey
Golfers from Orlando, Florida
1935 births
Living people